"Viva la Revolution" is a song by punk band the Adicts. It was re-recorded for their debut album Songs of Praise. It is one of the best-known songs by the band, and was featured in the 2003 video game Tony Hawk's Underground.

Track listing

Side One 
 "Viva la Revolution"

Side Two 
 "Steamroller (My Baby Got Run Over By A)"
 "Numbers"

Personnel

The Adicts
 Keith "Monkey" Warren – Vocals
 Pete "Pete Dee" Davison – Guitar  
 Mel "Spider" Ellis – Bass
 Michael "Kid Dee" Davison – Drums

References

The Adicts songs
1982 debut singles
1982 songs